Onorato Onorati was a Roman Catholic prelate who served as the first Bishop of Urbania e Sant'Angelo in Vado (1636–1683).

Biography
On 22 September 1636, Onorato Onorati was appointed during the papacy of Pope Urban VIII as Bishop of Urbania e Sant'Angelo in Vado. On 28 September 1636, he was consecrated bishop by Giulio Cesare Sacchetti, Cardinal-Priest of Santa Susanna, with Pietro Antonio Spinelli, Archbishop of Rossano, and Alexandre della Stufa, Bishop of Montepulciano, serving as co-consecrators. He served as Bishop of Urbania e Sant'Angelo in Vado until his resignation in August 1683.

Episcopal succession
While bishop, he was the principal co-consecrator of:
Gerolamo Pellegrini, Bishop of Melfi e Rapolla (1645);
Niccolò Albergati-Ludovisi, Archbishop of Bologna (1645);
Camillo Baldi, Bishop of Nicotera (1645);
Domenico Cennini, Bishop of Gravina di Puglia (1645);
Francisco Suárez de Villegas, Titular Bishop of Memphis (1649);
Giovanni Mastelloni, Bishop of Vieste (1654);
Pietro Frescobaldi, Bishop of San Miniato (1654); and
Paolo Squillanti, Bishop of Teano (1654).

References 

17th-century Italian Roman Catholic bishops
Bishops appointed by Pope Urban VIII